The College Park Line, designated Route 83, 83X, & 86 is a daily bus route operated by the Washington Metropolitan Area Transit Authority between the Rhode Island Avenue Station, which is served by Red Line of the Washington Metro, and the Cherry Hill Park Campground in College Park, MD (83, 83X) or Calverton (4061 Center Park Office Park Roadway) (86). 83X is a complementary, seasonal Metrobus route that only operates on short trips between the College Park–University of Maryland station & Cherry Hill Campground, via 83's routing. 83 is shortened to only operate on short trips between Rhode Island Avenue station and Mount Rainier, MD, during early mornings on the weekends. 83 & 86 mainly operate on the U.S. Route 1 corridor between Rhode Island Avenue in Northeast Washington D.C. & College Park, Maryland. Route 83 trips are roughly 50 minutes long, route 83X trips are roughly 10 minutes long, and route 86 trips are roughly 70 minutes long.

Current Route 

The 83, 83X, and 86 operate out of Landover division 7 days a week. Both 83 and 86 originally operated out of Bladensburg Division up until June, 2019 when they were shifted to make room for other routes at Bladensburg Division when Northern division closed due to structure failures. During the week, Route 83 operates every 30–60 minutes between 4:35 AM and 11:20 PM, while Route 86 operates every 30–60 minutes between 5:00 AM and 10:50 PM. On Saturdays, the 83 provides service on a 60-minute headway from 5:35 AM to 11:00 PM, while the 86 provides service also on a 60-minute headway from 7:03 AM to 11:28 PM. On Sundays, the 83 runs from 6:35 AM until 8:20 PM and the 86 runs from 7:03 AM until 7:50 PM every hour. Route 83X only operates three trips between Cherry Hill Park Campground and College Park station during the morning hours (8:30 AM–10:00 AM) from the third Monday in June through the second Friday of August each year.

The 83 is shortened to operate daily between Rhode Island Avenue station and Mount Rainier terminal only during early mornings on the weekends. These shortened trips were originally under Route 82 which was renamed the 83 in 2016. Select Route 83 trips operate between Rhode Island and College Park during Friday and Saturday late nights only.

During snow detours, routes 83 and 86 are rerouted to Greenbelt station with no service to Cherry Hill or Calverton. Additionally, route 86 would remain straight along Rhode Island Avenue with no service to Hyattsville Crossing station.

83 & 83X stops

86 stops

History

Background

Route 81

Route 81 originally operated as part of the North Capitol Street Line, alongside route 80, between Fort Totten station and West Potomac Park until around 1996/1997, when it was rerouted to operate between the Rhode Island Avenue station & Cherry Hill Campground as part of the Maryland Line alongside routes 82, 83, and 86, in order to replace the segment of 83's former routing to Greenbelt station, which was discontinued when 83 was rerouted to serve College Park–U of MD station instead. Routes 81 & 83 would pretty much operate on the same routing, only with the exception that 81 would serve the Greenbelt station, while 83 would serve the College Park-U of MD station. Route 83 was rescheduled to only operate between Monday through Saturday of each week, in order to avoid redundancy with the 81 Metrobus Route. On the other hand, Route 81 would also only operate on Sundays in order to avoid redundancy of Metrobus service between the intersection of Baltimore Avenue & Campus Drive (University of Maryland College Park Campus) and the Greenbelt station. However; 81 was eventually discontinued on March 27, 2016 when C2 began operating shortened Sunday trips between the intersection of Lebanon Street & University Boulevard East in Langley Park (which later on in December, 2016 was relocated to the Takoma - Langley Crossroads Transit Center) and the Greenbelt station, via the University of Maryland College Park Campus.

Route 82
The 82 Streetcar Line, which used to be the primary route that operated as part of the former Capital Transit Company (CTC) Maryland Line, operated between West Potomac Park and Branchville. The 82 streetcar line used to operate even further north of Branchville all the way up to Laurel. However, the route was truncated to terminate at Branchville during the late 1940s. During the 1950s, the 82 Streetcar Line was converted into a DC Transit Bus Route, as Capital Transit Company (CTC) was renamed as, "DC Transit". During this particular time, DC Transit Bus Route 82, was extended slightly north of its Branchville terminus, to Hollywood, via Rhode Island Avenue, Lackawanna Street, 53rd Avenue, 52nd Place, and Rhode Island Avenue. DC Transit Bus Route 82 was also minorly rerouted to serve the Seven Springs Apartment Complex on Cherry Hill Road in College Park, MD, once it opened around the mid-1960's/early 1970's. The line was eventually taken over by WMATA and officially became a Metrobus route on February 4, 1973, when WMATA acquired Capital Transit. WMATA kept the 82 route the same as its streetcar routing except serve the Rhode Island Avenue station when it opened on March 27, 1976, before returning to the intersection of Rhode Island Avenue NE, and operating on its usual routing towards West Potomac Park via Downtown Washington D.C.

Route 86
86 originally operated as a DC Transit Bus Route prior to becoming a WMATA Metrobus Route on February 4, 1973 when WMATA acquired DC Transit and three other major DC bus companies that were suffering financially, and merged them all together to form its Metrobus System.

86 originally operated between West Potomac Park & Riverdale, via Pennsylvania Avenue NW, 19th Street NW, C Street NW, 18th Street NW, Lafayette Square, G Street NW, 5th Street NW, New York Avenue NW/NE, 1st Street NE (towards West Potomac Park), O Street NE (towards Riverdale), Florida Avenue NE, Eckington Place NE, R Street NE, 2nd Street NE (towards West Potomac Park), 3rd Street NE (towards Riverdale), T Street NE, 4th Street NE, Rhode Island Avenue NE/Rhode Island Avenue, Baltimore Avenue, Riverdale Road, Rhode Island Avenue, and Queensbury Road.

Around  1977/1978, 86 was later rerouted to operate between West Potomac Park and College Park instead, via current routing between West Potomac Park and the intersection of Rhode Island Avenue & 38th Street in Brentwood, Maryland, then to operate via 38th Street/38th Avenue, Hamilton Street, 40th Avenue, Oglethorpe Street, 42nd Avenue, Queensbury Road, Belcrest Road, the Prince George's Plaza Shopping Center, East-West Highway, Baltimore Avenue, College Avenue, Dartmouth Avenue, Calvert Road, and Rhode Island Avenue, in order to replace G6's routing between Mount Rainier and College Park, when G6 got discontinued. The only difference was that unlike the G6 Metrobus Route, which operated on Queens Chapel Road between the intersections of East-West Highway and Baltimore Avenue in University Park, MD, 86 was forced to operate on East-West Highway up to the intersection of Baltimore Avenue, as Queens Chapel Road was closed at the intersection of East-West Highway by University Park around 1977/1978 to reduce disruptive traffic noise/flow through the neighborhood.

Changes
On September 24, 1978, as Metrorail Service increasde its frequency, Routes 82, 84, 85, 86, and 88 were shortened to only operate up to Rhode Island Avenue station. Route B6 was rerouted to operate between Rhode Island Avenue station and Metro Center via 82, 84, 85. 86, and 88's former routing eliminating its service between Mount Rainier and Cheverly. Service to Potomac Park was eliminated.

Route 88 was eventually discontinued on December 3, 1978 shortly after the Cheverly Station opened. Routes 84 and 85 were split off into their own separate line named the, Rhode Island Avenue–New Carrollton Line, after route 84 was extended from Riverdale (East Pines), to operate to the newly opened New Carrollton station. Route 85 would operate alongside route 84, except skipping 84's diversion in East Pines remaining straight on Riverdale Road during the weekday peak hours in the Northbound direction only as an express route.

Route 83 was also created on September 24, 1978, that would travel parallel to Route 82 except make limited stops and ease crowding during weekday peak hours.

Around the mid-1980's when the Cherry Hill Park Campground opened at the intersection of Jayrose Boulevard & Cherry Hill Road in College Park, MD, Routes 82 and 83 were rerouted to operate between the Rhode Island Avenue Station and Cherry Hill, via the Seven Springs Apartments Complex (that both routes would still continue to serve). During the time that this particular rerouting change took place, 82 and 83's former Hollywood Loop north of Rhode Island Avenue and Edgewood Road in College Park was eliminated.

On December 11, 1993, when the Green Line extension Greenbelt opened, Route 82 was truncated to only operate on short trips between the Rhode Island Avenue station and Mount Rainier during early morning, late night, and PM rush hours only eliminating service to Cherry Hill. Route 83 would replace the 82 and operate along its exact routing as the 82 except it would serve the newly opened Greenbelt station in between via Greenbelt Road and Cherrywood Lane.

Route 86 was also extended from its College Park terminus at the intersection of Dartmouth Avenue & Knox Road, to operate further north up to Centerpark Office Park (Calverton), in order to replace the segment of route R2's former routing between the intersection of Baltimore Avenue & Campus Drive (University of Maryland) and Calverton, via Baltimore Avenue, Rhode Island Avenue, Powder Mill Road, and Beltsville Drive, which was discontinued. Route 86 was also rerouted off Belcrest Road in order to serve the newly opened Prince George's Plaza station.

Around 1995, Route 81 was shifted from the North Capitol Street Line to operate as part of the Maryland Line between Rhode Island Avenue station and Cherry Hill, to simply operate as a variant of Route 83's routing, as 83 was rerouted to serve the College Park - U of MD station, instead of serving the Greenbelt station.

On January 13, 2001, the line was renamed as the, "College Park Line".

On May 15, 2003, the original bus bays at Prince George's Plaza Shopping Center were closed to build a new Target store. As a result, route 86 and other routes stopped directly entering and looping inside Prince George's Plaza.

On June 27, 2004, route 86 was permanently rerouted at the request of the city of College Park to directly serve the College Park–U of MD station by operating along the 83's routing along Baltimore Avenue, Paint Branch Parkway, and River Road instead of operating along College Ave, Dartmouth Ave, and Calvert Road.

Due to the construction of a new curb next to the new Mosaic Apartments built right next to Prince George's Plaza station around May/June, 2007, all Metrobus Routes that have previously exited Prince George's Plaza station from the northbound side, had to do so by exiting the Prince George's Plaza station via a right turn onto East-West Highway and left onto Belcrest Road. Route 86 was in the direction of Calverton to exit Prince George's Plaza station northbound, right onto East-West Highway and remain straight on East-West Highway to past Belcrest Road but was able to keep its entire routing in the direction of Rhode Island Avenue–Brentwood station the same as the route was still allowed to turn left from East-West Highway onto Belcrest Road, make a right turn from Belcrest Road to enter Prince George's Plaza station, and make a right turn southbound on Belcrest Road.

On August 25, 2011, WMATA added a new route to the College Park Line called "83X" as a pilot route during the summer in order to provide additional direct service from Cherry Hill Campground to College Park–U of MD station operating four weekdays trips only from 8:30 am to 10:00 am only from the third Monday in June through the second Friday through August.

During WMATA's Fiscal Year of 2015, WMATA proposed to split Route 83 and 86 into four routes. Route 83 and 86 would terminate at College Park station from Rhode Island Avenue station and be renamed Route 83S and 86S or keep their same names. The second portion was to be named route 83N and 86N or route R6 and R8 and will operate between College Park station and Cherry Hill (83N/R6) and Calverton (86N/R8) keeping the same routing with route 83 and 86. All existing service would still be covered but passengers will have to transfer at College Park station in order to continue their trips. If the proposal had gone through, it would mark the return of the R6 and R8 (unless it was switched to Route 83N/86N) service as they haven't operated since 1993 under the "Queens Chapel Road Line" (R6) and "Riggs Road Line" (R8).

During WMATA's FY2016 budget, it was proposed for route 83 to be given Sunday service replacing route 81 and discontinuing Sunday service to Greenbelt station. Routes 83 and 86 would replace route 81 in College Park while route C2 would replace route 81 between Greenbelt station and University of Maryland. The reason of the changes was for WMATA making the College Park Line easier to understand towards riders.

On March 27, 2016, route 81 service between Rhode Island Avenue station and Cherry Hill Campground was discontinued and replaced by route 83. Route 83 also added Sunday service replacing the 81 but no longer serving Greenbelt station where it was replaced by route C2. Route C2 also added Sunday service to replace Route 81 portion between Greenbelt Road and Greenbelt station.

On December 18, 2016, Route 82 was discontinued and was replaced by the 83. Short trips between Rhode Island Avenue station and Mount Rainier were made 83 routes instead during late nights and early mornings. Also, due to Metro closing at midnight during that time period because of SafeTrack maintenance, select Route 83 trips were introduced to operate between Rhode Island Avenue–Brentwood and College Park–U of MD station on Friday and Saturday late nights only.

On March 19, 2017, route 83 short trips between Rhode Island Avenue station and Mount Rainier during weekday peak-hours were discontinued and replaced by route G9.

Beginning on September 1, 2019, the College Park Metrobus loop was temporarily closed for construction of the Purple line at College Park station. As of a result, route 83 and 86 were temporarily rerouted to stops along River Road, and later to the west side of the station via Calvert Road in April, 2020.

During the COVID-19 pandemic, routes 83 and 86 were relegated to operate on its Saturday schedule beginning on March 16, 2020. However beginning on March 18, 2020, the route was further reduced to operate on its Sunday schedule. Also beginning on March 21, 2020, weekend service was further reduced with the 83 operating every 30 minutes and route 86 having all weekend service suspended. On August 23, 2020, additional service was added to routes 83 and 86 operating every 60 minutes with a 30-minute frequency along Baltimore Avenue. However Route 86 Sunday service remained suspended while Route 83 operated every 30 to 35 minutes in place.

In May 2020, WMATA announced that route 83X will not operate during for the 2020 summer season due to the ongoing COVID-19 pandemic and Metro's reduced service since March 16, 2020. Alternative service would be provided by routes 83 and 86.

On September 26, 2020, WMATA proposed to reduce the frequency of buses to every 60 minutes on both routes 83 and 86 and eliminate all route 86 Sunday service due to low federal funding. Route 86 has not operated on Sundays since March 15, 2020 due to Metro's response to the COVID-19 pandemic. Later in February 2021, due to low federal funds, WMATA proposed to extend route 83 to Greenbelt station to replace route C2 and eliminate all 86 service if WMATA does not get federal funding.

On September 5, 2021, route 86 Sunday service was restored and the line's pre-pandemic schedule was also restored.

On June 12, 2022, service to the east side of College Park station resumed with buses serving Bus Bay G.

References

External links
 83, 86 College Park Line – wmata.com

83